Alvis Joe Robb (March 15, 1937 – April 18, 1987) was an American football defensive lineman who played professionally in the National Football League (NFL) for the Philadelphia Eagles, St. Louis Cardinals, and the Detroit Lions.  He played college football at Texas Christian University and was selected in the 14th round of the 1959 NFL Draft by the Chicago Bears. He went to one Pro Bowl during his 13-year career.

References

1937 births
1987 deaths
American football defensive ends
Detroit Lions players
Philadelphia Eagles players
St. Louis Cardinals (football) players
TCU Horned Frogs football players
Eastern Conference Pro Bowl players
People from Lufkin, Texas
Players of American football from Texas